Tenasserim Island is an island in the Mergui Archipelago, Burma (Myanmar). It is located at the northwestern end of the archipelago 15 km to the south of Kabosa Island. 494 m high, Tenasserim Peak is the highest peak of this steep and thickly wooded island. It is a 10 km long and irregularly shaped island.

References

External links
Myanmar Ecotourism - Ministry of Hotels and Tourism
Mergui Archipelago Photos

Mergui Archipelago